I Could Never Be Your Woman is a 2007 American romantic comedy film directed and written by Amy Heckerling and starring Michelle Pfeiffer and Paul Rudd. It was released on May 11, 2007 in Spain, July 18 in Belgium, September 14 in Brazil, September 20 in Greece and October 19 in Taiwan. It was not released theatrically in the United States, instead going direct to DVD on February 12, 2008. It was also sent straight to DVD in Italy (February 6), the UK (July 14), Finland (August 6), Australia, Iceland (both August 27) and Germany (December 11), and on February 1, 2011 in France. The film's title is a line from the 1997 song "Your Woman" by British artist White Town.

Plot
Forty-five-year-old divorced mother Rosie (Michelle Pfeiffer) is a scriptwriter and producer for a TV show You Go Girl. Insecure about her age, she uses cosmetics to maintain her appearance. Very close to her thirteen-year-old daughter, Izzie (Saoirse Ronan), they become even closer when Izzie falls for Dylan (Rory Copus), a boy in her class.

Despite her ex-husband's urging that she starts dating again, Rosie is single. To the dismay of Rosie and David (David Mitchell) (her British co-writer), her boss Marty (Fred Willard) decides the show can't cover controversial subjects. So, Rosie decides to cast a new character for the show. Taken with Adam (Paul Rudd), a bright and charming young man from one of her auditions, she casts him as a new, nerdy character to fall for the arrogant and self-centered lead actress's character, Brianna (Stacey Dash). The new character tests well, so Rosie persuades Marty to give him a chance.

Rosie continues to offer Izzie advice on Dylan, as she becomes smitten with Adam, who suggests they go clubbing. When he picks her up, he bonds with Izzie immediately through a video game she was playing to impress Dylan. While out, Rosie lies that she's 37, while Adam says that he is 32. She is nervous about their age difference, but when he goes onto the dance floor at the nightclub, she realizes they are equally free-spirited, and joins him. Kissing in Adam's car, Rosie admits she's actually 40, and is startled when Adam confesses he's actually 29.

Adam assures her that he doesn't care about their age difference at all, and they continue their relationship. Nevertheless, Rosie's insecurity over her age surfaces, egged on by her internal conversations with Mother Nature (Tracey Ullman), and she tells Adam she is not sure that their relationship is going to work, to his confusion.

Meanwhile, their relationship draws the jealousy of Rosie's secretary, Jeannie (Sarah Alexander). She sabotages them by stealing Adam's gifts to Rosie, and then his phone, putting a sexy photograph of Brianna on it, and then dropping it in Rosie's handbag. Rosie continues to be nervous when she hears a recording of Adam flirting with Brianna (he was told to do so in order to keep her calm and the center of attention). Things become worse when Izzie has a failed double date with Dylan and becomes insecure about her appearance, something that concerns Rosie.

When Adam is first shown on television, he is an instant hit and becomes famous. This leads to Rosie becoming even more insecure, and worrying he will take advantage of his fame and start looking at younger women. Things get worse when the show is unexpectedly cancelled. Shortly after, Adam is given a role in an upcoming sitcom, and she is shocked to discover a speeding ticket sent to Adam showing him in a car with Brianna. Already in a foul mood, Rosie berates Izzie when, during a chance encounter with her friend, Henry Winkler, he reveals that Izzie and her friend had prank-called a number of celebrities in her phone book.

Rosie confronts Adam with the photograph of him and Brianna, and he is shocked, having never been in a car with her before. She angrily breaks it off. Despite this, Adam makes numerous attempts to reconcile, including refusing to film the new sitcom he has been offered until she is named co-producer. Meanwhile, Rosie is looking through a bloopers reel of her old show, realizing it was filmed at the time that the speeding ticket claimed Adam had been driving with Brianna, and deduces that Jeannie was behind it.

As Rosie confronts Jeannie, Marty calls to offer her a job on Adam's sitcom. She hits Jeannie in the face, reducing her to tears. She then reconciles with Adam. Later, at a school talent show, she sees Izzie has finally won Dylan over, and watches as they kiss. Mother Nature reminds her that, in growing older, she is making way for a girl like Izzie to replace her.

Cast
 Michelle Pfeiffer as Rosie Hanson
 Paul Rudd as Adam Pearl
 Saoirse Ronan as Izzie Mensforth
 Tracey Ullman as Mother Nature
 Jon Lovitz as Nathan Mensforth
 Sarah Alexander as Jeannie
 Fred Willard as Marty Watkin
 Stacey Dash as Brianna Minx
 Yasmin Paige as Melanie 
 O-T Fagbenle as Sean
 Twink Caplan as Sissy
 Henry Winkler as himself
 Rory Copus as Dylan
A number of British comedy actors have roles in the film, including David Mitchell, Mackenzie Crook, Steve Pemberton, Olivia Colman, Phil Cornwell and Sarah Alexander, as well as Irish comedy actors Graham Norton and Ed Byrne.

Production

Heckerling's inspiration for I Could Never Be Your Woman came from her own personal life as a single mother raising a young daughter during the making of the Clueless TV show. According to Missy Schwartz in an Entertainment Weekly article on the film, "Every day, she felt increasingly ambivalent about working in an industry that promotes unrealistic standards of beauty for young girls and considers women over 40 to be prehistoric beasts."

Heckerling sent her script for Woman to Paramount Pictures, but the studio was unnerved by the idea of backing a film about an older female protagonist. The script was eventually read by independent producer Philippe Martinez of Bauer Martinez Entertainment, and he picked up the film with a $25 million budget.

Principal photography began in August 2005 and ended later in the year. Although many scenes were shot in California, several scenes were shot in London, England to take advantage of tax incentives. In order to cut production costs even further, Martinez suggested to Michelle Pfeiffer to take a reduced salary ($1 million, plus 15% of the gross).

Release
Bauer Martinez signed a deal with Metro-Goldwyn-Mayer to distribute the film theatrically, and The Weinstein Company for DVD and non-pay TV distribution rights. MGM backed out upon learning about Pfeiffer's share in the film's revenue. After Bauer Martinez failed to find a theatrical distributor, the film was released straight to video in North America.

Reception

Review aggregation website Rotten Tomatoes gives the film a score of 64% based on reviews from 11 critics, with an average rating of 5.7/10.

Joe Leydon of Variety called it "A desperately unfunny mix of tepid showbiz satire and formulaic romantic comedy."

References

External links
 
 

2007 romantic comedy films
2007 direct-to-video films
2007 films
American romantic comedy films
Films directed by Amy Heckerling
Films shot at Pinewood Studios
Films with screenplays by Amy Heckerling
2000s English-language films
2000s American films
English-language romantic comedy films